Add-on is the Mozilla term for software modules that can be added to the Firefox web browser and related applications. Mozilla hosts them on its official add-on website.

Browser extensions are the primary type of add-on. In 2017, Mozilla enacted major changes to the application programming interface (API) for extensions in Firefox, replacing the long-standing XUL and XPCOM APIs with the WebExtensions API that is modeled after Google Chrome's API. Thus add-ons that remain compatible with Firefox are now largely compatible with Chrome as well. As of December, 2022, there are close to 30,000 add-ons and over 480,000 themes available for Firefox.

Current add-ons

Extensions

WebExtensions
Starting with Firefox 57, only the new WebExtensions API is supported.

Themes
Early versions of Firefox supported themes that could greatly change the appearance of the browser, but this was scaled back over time. Current themes are limited to changing the background and text color of toolbars. (These lightweight themes were formerly called personas.)

Historical add-ons

Extensions

Legacy extensions 
Prior to 2017, Firefox supported extensions developed with different APIs: XUL, XPCOM, and Jetpack. Mozilla now refers to these as legacy extensions.

Plug-ins 
Plug-ins are no longer supported in Firefox. In the past, they were used to handle media types for which the application did not have built-in capability. They were deprecated due to security concerns and improvements in Web APIs. The last one that was officially supported was Adobe Flash Player, which Adobe discontinued in 2020.

Restrictions
Mozilla had no mechanism to restrict the privileges of legacy Firefox extensions. This meant that a legacy extension could read or modify the data used by another extension or any file accessible to the user running Mozilla applications. But the current WebExtensions API imposes many restrictions.

Starting with Firefox 40, Mozilla began to roll out a requirement for extension signing. It is now required in all official Firefox releases.

Website

The Mozilla add-ons website is the official repository for Firefox add-ons. In contrast to mozdev.org which provides free hosting for Mozilla-related projects, the add-ons site is tailored for users. By default, Firefox automatically checks the site for updates to installed add-ons.

In January 2008, Mozilla announced that the site had accumulated a total of 600 million add-on downloads and that over 100 million installed add-ons automatically check the site for updates every day. In July 2012, the total had increased to 3 billion downloads from the site.

References

External links
 Official add-on website
 WebExtensions API reference documentation
 Extension Workshop, Mozilla's site for Firefox extension developer documentation

Mozilla
 
Free software websites